Colin Michael Poche (born January 17, 1994) is an American professional baseball pitcher for the Tampa Bay Rays of Major League Baseball (MLB).

Amateur career

Poche attended Marcus High School in Flower Mound, Texas. As a senior in 2012, he went 7–3 with a 0.21 earned run average (ERA). He was drafted by the Baltimore Orioles in the fifth round of the 2012 MLB draft out of high school, but did not sign and attended the University of Arkansas, where he played college baseball.

In June 2014, Poche underwent Tommy John Surgery and then did not pitch during 2015. After two years at Arkansas, he transferred to Dallas Baptist University. In 2016, as a redshirt junior, he pitched to a 9–1 record with a 2.38 ERA in 16 starts. After the season, he was selected by the Arizona Diamondbacks in the 14th round of the 2016 MLB draft.

Professional career

Arizona Diamondbacks
Poche signed with Arizona and made his professional debut during the 2016 season with the Hillsboro Hops, a Class A Short Season team, where he compiled a 1–2 record with a 3.19 ERA in 31 innings pitched. He spent 2017 with the Kane County Cougars and Visalia Rawhide where he posted a combined 3–1 record and 1.25 ERA in  innings pitched in relief. After the season, he pitched in the Arizona Fall League. Poche started 2018 with the Jackson Generals at the Double-A level.

Tampa Bay Rays
On May 1, 2018, Poche was acquired by the Tampa Bay Rays as a player to be named later to complete the Steven Souza trade from February 2018. After three games with the Montogmery Biscuits, Poche was promoted to the Triple-A Durham Bulls of the International League. Poche was named to the 2018 MLB Pipeline team of the year after pitching to a 0.82 ERA in 66 innings between both levels. Poche was also named the Rays minor league reliever of the year.

Poche returned to Durham to begin 2019 On June 8, his contract was selected and he was called up to the major leagues for the first time. He made his MLB debut that night versus the Boston Red Sox. He went on to make a total of 51 major-league appearances during 2019, all in relief, compiling a 5–5 record with a 4.70 ERA.

On July 21, 2020, the Rays announced Poche would miss the entire abbreviated 2020 season with a torn UCL that required Tommy John surgery. On February 17, 2021, Poche was placed on the 60-day injured list as he continued to recover from surgery. He did not pitch professionally during the 2021 season. In 2022, Poche made six relief appearances with Triple-A Durham, and 64 relief appearances with Tampa Bay during the regular season.

References

External links

Living people
1994 births
Baseball players from Texas
People from Flower Mound, Texas
Baseball players from Columbus, Ohio
People from Columbus, Ohio
Major League Baseball pitchers
Tampa Bay Rays players
Arkansas Razorbacks baseball players
Dallas Baptist Patriots baseball players
Hillsboro Hops players
Kane County Cougars players
Visalia Rawhide players
Jackson Generals (Southern League) players
Montgomery Biscuits players
Durham Bulls players
Salt River Rafters players